Brunneria brasiliensis, common name Brazilian stick mantis, is a species of praying mantis found in Argentina, Brazil, and Paraguay.

See also
List of mantis genera and species

References

B
Mantodea of South America
Insects of Brazil
Arthropods of Argentina
Invertebrates of Paraguay
Insects described in 1870